Konstantin Sergeyevich Savenkov (born March 25, 1990) is a Kazakhstani professional ice hockey forward currently playing for the Kazzinc-Torpedo of the VHL. He was a member of the Kazakhstan men's national ice hockey team during the 2012 IIHF World Championship.

Career statistics

Regular season and playoffs

International

References

External links

1990 births
Barys Nur-Sultan players
Kazakhstani ice hockey left wingers
Kazzinc-Torpedo players
Living people
Asian Games gold medalists for Kazakhstan
Medalists at the 2017 Asian Winter Games
Asian Games medalists in ice hockey
Ice hockey players at the 2017 Asian Winter Games
Universiade medalists in ice hockey
Universiade silver medalists for Kazakhstan
Competitors at the 2013 Winter Universiade
Competitors at the 2017 Winter Universiade
Sportspeople from Oskemen